Edwin Roscoe Mullins (22 August 1848- 9 January 1907) was a British sculptor known for a number of architectural sculptures and smaller works featuring neo-classical figures.

Biography
Mullins was born at Holborn in central London and attended Lough Grammar School and, from 1863 to 1865, Marlborough College in Wiltshire. He trained at the Lambeth School of Art before studying at the Royal Academy Schools from 1967. In 1868 he won a gold medal in the National Art Competition for a model from the antique. Mullins was sponsered at the Royal Academy Schools by the sculptor John Birnie Philip and subsequently worked for him as an assistant before moving to Munich where he studied under Michael Wagmüller and also shared a studio with Edward Onslow Ford. In 1872 he won a silver medal at Munich and a bronze at Vienna for his work Sympathy.

Mullins returned to London around 1874. There, he created sculptures of neo-classical figures and portrait busts and statuettes and was, for a time, associated with the New Sculpture movement. He became a regular exhibitor at the Royal Academy, the New Gallery and the Grosvenor Gallery and in 1884 he was elected to the Art Workers Guild. He also exhibited with the Society of British Artists, the Glasgow Institute of the Fine Arts, at the Walker Art Gallery in Liverpool and at Manchester City Art Gallery. Mullins also received a number of public commissions and at the 1900 Exposition Universelle in Paris was awarded a silver medal. In 1890 he published A Primer of Sculpture and was appointed as an instructor in modelling for architecture at the Central School of Arts and Crafts in 1897. He died in 1907 at Walberswick in Suffolk.

Selected public works

References

External links

1848 births
1907 deaths
19th-century English sculptors
19th-century English male artists
20th-century English sculptors
20th-century English male artists
Alumni of the City and Guilds of London Art School
Alumni of the Royal Academy Schools
British architectural sculptors
English male sculptors
People educated at Marlborough College
People from Holborn
Sculptors from London